Débora Patrícia Teixeira Artur Candeias Nogueira (born October 26, 1985 in Almada, Setúbal) is a Portuguese foil fencer. Nogueira qualified for the women's individual foil event at the 2008 Summer Olympics in Beijing, after finishing second from the European Qualification Tournament in Lisbon. She lost the first preliminary round match to China's Su Wanwen, with a score of 4–15.

References

External links
Profile – FIE
NBC Olympics Profile

Portuguese female foil fencers
Living people
Olympic fencers of Portugal
Fencers at the 2008 Summer Olympics
Sportspeople from Almada
1985 births